Red Hot + Rhapsody: The Gershwin Groove is a compilation album produced by Paul Heck of the Red Hot Organization (RHO) to celebrate the 100th birthday of George Gershwin. This compilation is the twelfth entry from the international organization's Red Hot Benefit Series. As with other compilations toward the series, this release serves as a fundraising tool for the RHO's AIDS awareness efforts.

Notable acts contributing to the album include: Bobby Womack, David Bowie, The Roots, Morcheeba, Duncan Sheik, Natalie Merchant, Jovanotti and a host of others. Sinéad O'Connor, who contributed on Red Hot + Blue (the first album in the benefit series), returned for this album as both a performer and as co-producer alongside Heck and Phil Ramone.

Track listing 
"Summertime", performed by Morcheeba + Hubert Laws
"It Ain't Necessarily So", performed by Finley Quaye
"But Not for Me", performed by Natalie Merchant (featuring Chris Botti)
"They Can't Take That Away From Me", performed by Smoke City
"I Got Plenty o' Nuthin", performed by Spearhead + Ernest Ranglin
"Summertime", performed by Bobby Womack + The Roots
"I Was Doing All Right", performed by Davina
"Embraceable You", performed by Duncan Sheik (featuring Chris Botti)
"Let's Call The Whole Thing Off", performed by Clark Terry
"I've Got a Crush on You", performed by Luscious Jackson
"I Got Rhythm", performed by Jovanotti
"Peter Sellers Sings George Gershwin", performed by Money Mark
"Nice Work if You Can Get It", performed by Majestic 12
"The Man I Love", performed by Sarah Cracknell + Kid Loco
'S Wonderful / Rhapsody in Blue", performed by Skylab
"Someone to Watch Over Me", performed by Sinéad O'Connor
"Bess, You Is My Woman Now", performed by Baaba Maal
"A Foggy Day (In London Town)", performed by David Bowie + Angelo Badalamenti

References

External links 
Red Hot + Rhapsody: The Gershwin Groove Album information, as listed by Discogs.
The memory of Gershwin prompts host of albums news story on CNN
Alternate link for Village Voice review provided by reviewer, Robert Christgau

Red Hot Organization albums
Albums produced by Phil Ramone
1998 compilation albums
Jazz fusion compilation albums
George and Ira Gershwin tribute albums